Örnólfur Valdimarsson (born 4 November 1964) is an Icelandic alpine skier. He competed in three events at the 1992 Winter Olympics.

References

1964 births
Living people
Örnólfur Valdimarsson
Örnólfur Valdimarsson
Alpine skiers at the 1992 Winter Olympics
Örnólfur Valdimarsson
20th-century Icelandic people